Michael White (born 5 November 1964) is a Jamaican bobsledder. He competed at the 1988 Winter Olympics and the 1992 Winter Olympics.

References

External links
 

1964 births
Living people
Jamaican male bobsledders
Olympic bobsledders of Jamaica
Bobsledders at the 1988 Winter Olympics
Bobsledders at the 1992 Winter Olympics
Place of birth missing (living people)